Sir Alexander Lyell McEwin, KBE (29 May 1897 – 23 September 1988), always known as "Lyell McEwin" was a politician in South Australia.

History
Lyell McEwin was born in the Hundred of Hart, the youngest son of Alexander Lyell McEwin (1862 – 29 December 1927) and Jessie Smilie McEwin née Ferguson who married 30 May 1888. He was educated locally and won a scholarship to Prince Alfred College. He attended the college for a period, but returned to the family farm at age 14.

In the 1930s he was a member of the Agricultural Settlement Committee, president of the Blyth Agricultural Bureau and the Blyth Veterinary Lodge, Captain of the Blyth Rifle Club, Vice-president of the Blyth Bowling Club, and a member of the Board of Management Blyth District Hospital, member of the District Council of Hutt and Hill Rivers; and a committee member of the Blyth Agricultural and Horticultural Society, and deeply involved in several organizations associated with the Liberal and Country League.

In October 1934, campaigning as a "practical farmer", McEwin won the Northern district seat in the Legislative Council made vacant by the death of William Morrow. He retained the seat until June 1975, when he retired.

McEwin filled the Cabinet positions of Chief Secretary from 1939, coupled with Minister of Mines and Minister of Health. It was perhaps as Minister of Health that he left the greatest mark. He oversaw the provision of many country hospitals funded on a subsidy basis: for every pound a local auxiliary raised, the Government contributed two. The major teaching hospital constructed on his watch was that at Elizabeth, later named the Lyell McEwin Hospital in his honour. While perfectly adequate, the building was designed with economy in mind. McEwin's "practical farmer" frugality appealed to Premier Playford.

He was elected President of the South Australian Legislative Council on 8 March 1967.

Family
He married Dora Winifred Williams (born 9 May 1898) of "Fairview", Blyth, South Australia on 16 February 1921. They had four sons and a daughter.

Other interests
He was a member of the Caledonian Society of South Australia and its chief from 1959 to 1968.

He was a longtime worshipper at St. Andrew's Presbyterian Church, North Adelaide.

Recognition
On 10 June 1954 he was appointed Sir Alexander Lyell McEwin, KBE for his service as Minister of Health & Mines in South Australia.

His portrait, painted by Sir Ivor Hele hangs in Parliament House.

His name is commemorated in the Lyell McEwin Hospital.

References 

 

1897 births
1988 deaths
Members of the South Australian Legislative Council
Liberal and Country League politicians
20th-century Australian politicians
Presidents of the South Australian Legislative Council
Australian Knights Commander of the Order of the British Empire
Australian politicians awarded knighthoods
Australian farmers